Anna Melikian (born February 8, 1976) is a Russian film and TV director/ producer whose work has been recognized with various awards at major international film festivals. After her participation at Sundance Film Festival she was listed in the TOP 10 of most perspective film directors by Variety magazine.

Biography 
Anna Melikian was born in Baku, Azerbaijan. She spent her childhood in Yerevan, Armenia. At the age of 17 she moved to Moscow, Russia.

Melikian studied at the All-Russian State University of Cinematography film school in Moscow (classes of Prof. Sergey Solovyov and Valery Rubinchik), where she was awarded the St. Anna prize for Poste restante (2000).

In the 1990s, she worked for a while on television as a director of several programs and as a writer of video commercials and TV projects.

After the graduation she was granted by GosKino Russian organization, made various documental and TV films. In 2008 Melikian's Mermaid (2007) was awarded by the Berlin International Film Festival Prize.

Since 2005 all her films are shot under her private brand – the cinema company Magnum.

Awards
 Berlin International Film Festival, 2008, FIPRESCI Prize for: Rusalka (2007)
 Clermont-Ferrand International Short Film Festival, 2001, Special Jury Award for Poste restante (2000)
 Golden Apricot Yerevan International Film Festival, 2008, Feature Film for Rusalka (2007)
 Karlovy Vary International Film Festival, 2008, Independent Camera Award for Rusalka (2007)
 Melbourne International Film Festival, 2001, City of Melbourne Award for Best Short Experimental Poste restante (2000)
 Sofia International Film Festival, 2008, Grand Prix for Rusalka (2007)
 Sundance Film Festival, 2008, Directing Award, World Cinema - Dramatic for Rusalka (2007)
Kinotavr, 2014, Directing Award, Star (2014)
 The Golden Unicorn Awards, 2016, Best short film "8"
The Golden Eagle Award, 2016, Best movie, About love (2015)

Filmography

Director

 Fairy (Фея, Feya) 2020
Tenderness (Нежность) 2020
The Three (Трое) 2020
 About Love (Про любовь, Pro lyubov') 2015
 Star (Звезда, Zvezda) 2014
 Mermaid (Русалка, Rusalka) 2007
 Mars (Марс) 2004
 Poste restante (До Востребования) 2000

Producer
 The Ghost (2008) (producer)
 Bride at any Cost (2009) (producer)
 Semeyka Ady (2007) (co-producer)

Writer
 Mermaid 2007
 Mars 2004

References

External links

Anna Melikian's "Mermaid" Won A Prize
Biography in Russian
Interview with Melikian

Film people from Baku
Russian people of Armenian descent
Russian film directors
Russian women film directors
Women television directors
Living people
1976 births